Dark Blue is the fifth album led by jazz pianist and mathematician Rob Schneiderman, released on the Reservoir label in 1994.

Reception 

In his review on AllMusic, Michael G. Nastos stated "Mainstream, straight-ahead, well-played jazz is alive and well, courtesy of pianist Rob Schneiderman and his very fine quintet of Ralph Moore (tenor sax), Brian Lynch (trumpet), Peter Washington (bass), and Lewis Nash (drums). They collectively coax and conjure the feeling of the 1950s' Blue Note-Riverside hard-to-post bop sound that remains timeless and forever swinging. The leader wrote five of these nine selections with this era in mind, while also recognizing that being a modernist doesn't necessarily mean throwing traditions overboard."

Track listing 
All compositions by Rob Schneiderman except where noted
 "Dark Blue" - 5:41
 "The Touch of Your Lips" (Ray Noble) - 7:57
 "The Lion's Mane" - 8:09
 "Silent Conversation" - 4:19
 "Smoke Screen" (Brian Lynch) - 8:56
 "East Bay Blues" - 6:14
 "This Love of Mine" (Henry W. Sanicola, Jr., Sol Parker, Frank Sinatra) - 4:57
 "People Will Say We're in Love" (Richard Rodgers, Oscar Hammerstein II) - 6:06
 "City Limits" - 7:07

Credits 
 Rob Schneiderman - piano
 Brian Lynch - trumpet
 Ralph Moore - tenor and soprano saxophone
 Peter Washington - bass
 Lewis Nash - drums

References 

Rob Schneiderman albums
1994 albums
Reservoir Records albums
Albums recorded at Van Gelder Studio